The Shandrin is a river in Yakutia (Sakha Republic), Russia.

It is a left tributary of the Indigirka, flowing across the Allaikhovsky District. There are no inhabited places in its course. The river usually freezes in early October and stays frozen until late May or early June.

History 
The Shandrin mammoth was discovered in 1974 near the river at the feet of a steep slope in the eastern side of the Kondakov Plateau by geologist B. S. Rusanov of the Yakutsk Institute of Geology. The study of the carcass revealed that the mammoth had died between 41 and 32 thousand years ago. Its entrails were well-preserved and their contents made it possible to determine the composition of the paleoflora of the area at the time the animal had lived. The contents of the entrails included species of grasses, sedges, wormwood, larch, spruce, dwarf pine, birch, alder and willow.

Course 
The Shandrin river begins north of the Arctic Circle, in the Orgolyor (Орголёр) lake of the northern slopes of the Ulakhan-Sis. It heads roughly eastwards across a treeless hilly area by the Kondakov Plateau until the mouth of its Antykchan tributary, after which it bends northeastwards and flows across a partly swampy floodplain. There are many lakes in the lower part of the basin where the river meanders across a wide plain among lakes. Finally the Shandrin joins the Indigirka in the Kolymskaya channel of its delta near Lake Bolshoi Otor.

See also
List of rivers of Russia

References

External links
Meteorological stations and hydrological gauges within the study basins

Rivers of the Sakha Republic